Amelia Herr (born January 5, 2003) is an American professional wrestler and taekwondo practitioner best known for her time signed to WWE on the NXT brand under the ring name Sloane Jacobs. She continues to wrestle on independent wrestling circuits under the name Notorious Mimi.

Early life
Herr is a native of West Chester, Pennsylvania and a 2021 graduate of Unionville High School in Kennett Square, Pennsylvania. She majored in Criminal Justice. Herr has two years of training in Taekwondo, and was trained in professional wrestling at the Monster Factory in Paulsboro, New Jersey.

Professional career

All Elite Wrestling (2021)
Herr began regularly wrestling on the independent circuits in 2018, participating in several promotions, particularly in the Northeastern United States. She made her debut with All Elite Wrestling on October 11, 2021, in a losing match to Penelope Ford on AEW Dark: Elevation. She went on to make several appearances on AEW Dark and AEW Dark: Elevation, including a match against Emi Sakura on Elevation on December 13, 2021.

WWE (2022)
Herr participated in tryouts at the WWE Performance Center in Orlando, Florida in December 2021. She was announced among a class of recruits who reported to the WWE Performance Center on March 14, 2022, to begin training with WWE. She began performing for their NXT brand and made her WWE debut on NXT on March 29, in a loss to Nikkita Lyons. She also faced newcomer Roxanne Perez on NXT Level Up on April 15, which also resulted in a defeat for Jacobs.
Jacobs picked up her first victory in NXT over Thea Hail on the May 3, 2022 edition of NXT 2.0.  On the July 19 episode of NXT, Jacobs competed in a 20-woman battle royal to determine the number one contender for the NXT Women's Championship, which was won by a returning Zoey Stark. On November 1, 2022, it was reported that Herr was released from her WWE contract along with other NXT talent.

Championships and accomplishments
Monster Factory Pro Wrestling
MFPW Girls Championship (3 times)
MFPW Supersonic Championship (1 time)

Invictus Pro Wrestling
Invictus Women's Championship (1 time)

Kickstart My Heart Wrestling
KSMH Viking Or Valkyrie Intergender Championship (1 time) 

Titan Championship Wrestling
TCW Goddess Championship (1 time)

References

External links
Profile at CageMatch.net
Facebook Fan Page

2003 births
American female professional wrestlers
American female taekwondo practitioners
Living people
Sportspeople from Chester County, Pennsylvania
Professional wrestlers from Pennsylvania
21st-century professional wrestlers